Osmaniye can refer to:

 Osmaniye
 Osmaniye, Bayramiç
 Osmaniye, Biga
 Osmaniye, Çorum
 Osmaniye, İznik
 Osmaniye, Kestel
 Osmaniye, Mustafakemalpaşa
 Osmaniye, Orhaneli